Jeffrey Lynn Earnhardt (born June 22, 1989) is an American professional stock car racing driver who competes full-time in the NASCAR Xfinity Series, driving the No. 44 Chevrolet Camaro for Alpha Prime Racing. He is the son of Kerry Earnhardt, grandson of Dale Earnhardt, nephew of Dale Earnhardt Jr., great grandson of Ralph Earnhardt and brother of Bobby Dale Earnhardt.

Racing career

Earnhardt's first race came in the hornet division at Wythe Raceway in Rural Retreat, Virginia. He scored three feature wins and finished in the top-five in division points, winning rookie of the year. The following year he moved up to the sportsman division at the Motor Mile Speedway in Radford, Virginia, finishing the season in the top-10 of the division standings. He competed in the late model season finale at the track as a teammate to RCR developmental driver Allison Duncan.

In 2006, General Motors created a driver developmental search program wherein they looked for individuals they believed to be the stars of the future and invited them to test a late model and a Busch car at two different tracks with the best moving on. Earnhardt made the final cut. In 2007, Earnhardt drove the No. 1 Chevrolet for Andy Santerre Motorsports in the NASCAR Busch East Series. He finished fifth in the 2007 Busch East point standings and won the Most Popular Driver Award at the end of the season.

In 2008, Earnhardt returned to what is now known as the ARCA Menards Series East for another full season. Earnhardt was unexpectedly replaced in the car at Dover in September 2008 with Aric Almirola who won the race. When DEI subsequently merged with Chip Ganassi Racing, their driver development program went into limbo, and Earnhardt was released.

In 2010, Earnhardt drove several races with Rick Ware Racing which qualified him to drive on all NASCAR tracks in the 2011 season. He signed with RWR to drive a full season in 2011 and make his run for rookie of the year in the NASCAR Camping World Truck Series. However, he was originally released from the team after offering his driving services to other truck teams. Earnhardt and Ware later reconciled, citing a lack of communication from both parties. RWR ran Earnhardt in the 24 Hours of Daytona where they finished 12th.

Earnhardt moved to the grand-am Rolex Sports Car Series in 2012, where he raced in the GT class for Rick Ware Racing.

In November 2012, he announced he would be competing for rookie of the year in the NASCAR Nationwide Series in 2013, driving the No. 79 for Go Green Racing; sponsorship issues later limited his schedule with the team.

On April 4, 2013, it was announced that Earnhardt would drive the No. 5 Chevrolet Camaro for JR Motorsports in a one-race agreement for the Nationwide race at Richmond International Raceway.

In the 2013 Charlotte testing for Sprint Cup cars, Earnhardt tested a car for Go Green Racing.

For 2014, Earnhardt moved full-time to the Nationwide Series, driving the No. 4 Chevrolet for JD Motorsports. During the Subway Firecracker 250 at Daytona, he was replaced by Matt DiBenedetto during the first caution period, since Earnhardt had suffered a fractured collarbone in a motorcycle accident during the week. His car was sponsored by The Great Outdoors RV Superstore for the Nationwide series Zippo 200 race at Watkins Glen International where he finished 21st. He would then finish 18th in the point standings and was also released by JD Motorsports after his disappointing season.

Before the 2015 season started, Earnhardt was picked up by Viva Motorsports to drive the season opener at Daytona. He finished 15th in the Daytona race.

Earnhardt made his Sprint Cup Series debut at the 2015 Federated Auto Parts 400 at Richmond International Raceway for Go Fas Racing. When he started this race, he became the second 4th generation driver to compete in NASCAR's top series, with Adam Petty being the first. 

After his prior success in racing Can-am and Cyclops created a partnership with Earnhardt and on September 18, Go Fas Racing announced that Earnhardt would run the majority of the 2016 Sprint Cup Series season, except for restrictor plate races that Bobby Labonte ran and road course races that Boris Said entered, with sponsorship from Can-Am motorcycles. He competed for Cup Rookie of the Year honors. Earnhardt joined BK Racing for the Hellmann's 500 at Talladega Superspeedway, driving the No. 83. He returned to BK for the AAA Texas 500, driving the No. 83 in place of an injured Matt DiBenedetto. Earnhardt then made his final start with BK Racing at Homestead, finishing 31st.

After the 2016 season ended, Go Fas Racing announced that Earnhardt would not return to the No. 32 team for 2017, and was replaced by Matt DiBenedetto. In January 2017, Earnhardt announced that he would drive the No. 33 Chevrolet for Circle Sport – The Motorsports Group. The following month, Earnhardt made his CS–TMG debut at the Daytona 500, and in his debut with the team, Earnhardt made NASCAR history by becoming the first-ever fourth-generation driver to compete in the Daytona 500. He started 33rd and finished 26th (which tied his career-best finish up to that point) after being involved in a crash on lap 143.
 Earnhardt raced the full season except for the road courses. Starter sponsored the early part of the season, while Hulu stepped in to sponsor the majority.

On October 15, 2017, Earnhardt signed a contract extension to remain with CS–TMG for the 2018 season. However, on December 12, Circle Sport Racing and The Motorsports Group ended their partnership, leaving Earnhardt temporarily without a ride. Earnhardt ended up joining the No. 00 StarCom Racing team for the 2018 Daytona 500, marking the 40th consecutive year that a member of the Earnhardt family had driven in the event. Earnhardt also ran the next four races for StarCom and planned to run the full season for the team, but after the fifth race of the season, he and the team parted ways. On May 22, it was announced that Earnhardt would drive the No. 55 for Premium Motorsports in Charlotte's Coca-Cola 600. The week following the race, he announced more races with the team but did not name an exact number. On July 7, Earnhardt finished 11th at the Coke Zero Sugar 400, which was his career best Cup Series finish up to that point. On July 28, 2018, it was announced that Earnhardt would join Gaunt Brothers Racing in their No. 96 Toyota for 14 races, with sponsorship from Xtreme Concepts.

In November 2018, Earnhardt joined Joe Gibbs Racing's for the 2019 NASCAR Xfinity Series season, driving the No. 18 Toyota Supra in nine races and sharing the ride with Riley Herbst, Kyle Busch, and Denny Hamlin. At the summer Charlotte race, Earnhardt scored a career-best third place finish, despite sustaining damage from hitting the turn 3 wall on lap 142.

On February 14, 2019, security company and sponsor Xtreme Concepts announced the formation of XCI Racing, which would field the No. 81 Toyota Camry and Supra for Earnhardt at the two Talladega Cup and five Xfinity races, respectively. Although Earnhardt stated that he would like to build with XCI to a full season in NASCAR's premier series in 2020, the team withdrew from the 2019 Circle K Firecracker 250 before Earnhardt announced his departure from XCI and JGR on August 7.

Earnhardt returned to JD Motorsports in 2020 on a 12-race schedule. After running 29 races during the 2020 season, he was elevated to a full-time schedule with the team in 2021 in the No. 0.

On November 9, 2021, Earnhardt announced that he would not return to JD Motorsports in 2022 in order to pursue opportunities to drive for a top-tier team whether it be full-time or part-time. On January 14, 2022, it was announced that Earnhardt would drive part-time for Sam Hunt Racing in 2022. He would drive both of the team's cars, the part-time No. 24 and the full-time No. 26. Earnhardt's sponsor for most of the races in 2021, ForeverLawn, also moved with him from JDM to Sam Hunt Racing. Earnhardt would also drive the No. 35 car for Emerling-Gase Motorsports in the spring race at Phoenix. and the No. 3 car for Richard Childress Racing in the spring race at Talladega. It was the first time that Earnhardt drove the No. 3, the number made famous by his grandfather Dale when he drove for RCR in the Cup Series, in NASCAR and the first time he drove for RCR in NASCAR. He collected his first career Pole award, and finished the race in a career-best second place behind Noah Gragson.

In 2023, Earnhardt would run full-time for Alpha Prime Racing in the No. 44 Chevrolet.

MMA career
Earnhardt made his amateur debut in mixed martial arts on May 22, 2012, defeating Chris Faison by unanimous decision in Charlotte, North Carolina.

Personal life and family
Earnhardt is a fourth generation NASCAR driver. He is the middle child of Kerry Earnhardt, nephew of Dale Earnhardt Jr., grandson of NASCAR Hall of Fame driver Dale Earnhardt, and great-grandson of Ralph Earnhardt. He has four siblings: a paternal half-sister, Kayla and two maternal half-brothers, James and David. His older brother, Bobby Dale Earnhardt, retired in 2019 from the ARCA Racing Series.

Motorsports career results

NASCAR
(key) (Bold – Pole position awarded by qualifying time. Italics – Pole position earned by points standings or practice time. * – Most laps led.)

Monster Energy Cup Series

Daytona 500

Xfinity Series

Camping World Truck Series

Camping World East Series

Pinty's Series

Whelen Euro Series – Elite 1

 Season still in progress 
 Ineligible for series points

24 Hours of Daytona
(key)

References

External links

 
 

1989 births
24 Hours of Daytona drivers
Jeffrey
Living people
NASCAR drivers
People from Mooresville, North Carolina
Racing drivers from North Carolina
Rolex Sports Car Series drivers
Dale Earnhardt Inc. drivers
JR Motorsports drivers
Joe Gibbs Racing drivers
American male mixed martial artists
Mixed martial artists from North Carolina
Richard Childress Racing drivers